David Gerard O'Connell (August 16, 1953 – February 18, 2023) was an Irish-born prelate of the Catholic Church who was an auxiliary bishop of the Archdiocese of Los Angeles in California from 2015 until his murder in 2023. He served in the Los Angeles area for the entirety of his career as a priest.

Early life and career
David O'Connell was born in Glanmire, County Cork, Ireland, on August 16, 1953, the son of David and Joan O’Connell. He earned a bachelor's degree in philosophy and English literature at University College Dublin in 1975 and a Bachelor of Divinity degree from Maynooth College in 1977. He completed his studies for the priesthood at All Hallows College in Dublin. He was ordained a deacon by Ireland-born Cardinal Timothy Manning of Los Angeles. He was ordained a priest for the Archdiocese of Los Angeles on July 10, 1979, at All Hallows by John Scanlon, the Ireland-born Bishop of Honolulu. In 1987, while serving in Los Angeles, he obtained a Masters of Spirituality from Mount St. Mary's College.

After his ordination, O'Connell served as associate pastor at three parishes in Southern California: St. Raymond in Downey from 1979 to 1983, St. Maria Goretti in Long Beach in 1983/84, and St. Hillary in Pico Rivera from 1984 to 1988. He later served as pastor at four Los Angeles parishes: St. Frances Xavier Cabrini and Ascension Parish from 1988 to 2003, Ascension Catholic, St. Eugene from 2004 to 2006, and St. Michael from 2003 to 2015.

On the archdiocesan level, O'Connell also served for various periods as a diocesan deacon and a member of the Council of Priests. He was also a member of the Priest Pension Board, the Together in Mission Board, and the Archdiocesan Finance Council. He was a Knight of Peter Claver.

Auxiliary Bishop of Los Angeles 
Pope Francis appointed O'Connell titular bishop of Cell Ausaille and an auxiliary bishop of the Archdiocese of Los Angeles on July 21, 2015. He was consecrated by Archbishop José Gómez on September 8, 2015. Gómez named O'Connell his episcopal vicar for the San Gabriel Pastoral Region. He was invested as a Knight Grand Officer in the Equestrian Order of the Holy Sepulchre of Jerusalem in September 2022.

Murder
Police found O'Connell dead from a gunshot wound to the chest at his home in Hacienda Heights at approximately 1 p.m. PST on February 18, 2023. He was 69. A deacon had called for emergency medical help when he visited the house after O'Connell failed to attend a scheduled meeting. Police opened a homicide investigation.

On February 20, police arrested 65-year-old Carlos Medina at his residence in Torrance, California. Carlos Medina's wife was O'Connell's housekeeper and has performed work on O'Connell's house. On February 22, Los Angeles District Attorney George Gascón reported that Medina had confessed to murdering O'Connell. He reported that O'Connell had suffered multiple gunshot wounds.

References

External links
Bishop David Gerard O’Connell at Catholic Hierarchy 
Roman Catholic Archdiocese of Los Angeles Official Site

1953 births
2023 deaths
Alumni of St Patrick's College, Maynooth
Alumni of University College Dublin
Alumni of All Hallows College, Dublin
21st-century Roman Catholic bishops in the United States
21st-century American Roman Catholic titular bishops
Bishops appointed by Pope Francis
Deaths by firearm in California
Irish emigrants to the United States
People from County Cork
Knights of Peter Claver & Ladies Auxiliary